Araç District is a district of the Kastamonu Province of Turkey. Its seat is the town of Araç. Its area is 1,446 km2, and its population is 17,920 (2021).

Composition
There is one municipality in Araç District:
 Araç

There are 119 villages in Araç District:

 Ahatlar		
 Akgeçit		
 Akıncılar		
 Aksu		
 Aktaş		
 Alakaya		
 Alınören		
 Aşağıçobanözü		
 Aşağıılıpınar		
 Aşağıikizören		
 Aşağıoba		
 Aşağıyazı		
 Avlacık		
 Avlağıçayırı		
 Bahçecik		
 Balçıkhisar		
 Başköy		
 Bektüre		
 Belen		
 Belkavak		
 Buğdam		
 Çalköy		
 Çamaltı		
 Çavuşköy		
 Çaykaşı		
 Celepler		
 Çerçiler		
 Cevizlik		
 Çubukludere		
 Çukurpelit		
 Damla		
 Değirmençay		
 Dereçatı		
 Deretepe		
 Doğanca		
 Doğanpınar		
 Doruk		
 Ekinözü		
 Erekli		
 Eskiiğdir		
 Fındıklı		
 Gemi		
 Gergen		
 Gökçeçat		
 Gökçesu		
 Gölcük		
 Gülükler		
 Güzelce		
 Güzlük		
 Haliloba		
 Hanözü		
 Hatipköy		
 Huruçören		
 İğdir		
 İğdirkışla		
 İhsanlı		
 Karaçalar		
 Karacık		
 Karakaya		
 Karcılar		
 Kavacık		
 Kavak		
 Kayabaşı		
 Kayaboğazı		
 Kayaören		
 Kemerler		
 Kirazlı		
 Kışlaköy		
 Kıyan		
 Kıyıdibi		
 Kızılören		
 Kızılsaray		
 Köklüdere		
 Köklüyurt		
 Köseköy		
 Kovanlı		
 Muratlı		
 Müslimler		
 Okçular		
 Okluk		
 Ömersin		
 Oycalı		
 Özbel		
 Palazlar		
 Pelitören		
 Pınarören		
 Recepbey		
 Saltuklu		
 Samatlar		
 Sarıhacı		
 Sarpun		
 Şehrimanlar		
 Şenyurt		
 Serdar		
 Sıragömü		
 Şiringüney		
 Sofçular		
 Sümenler		
 Susuz		
 Taşpınar		
 Tatlıca		
 Tavşanlı		
 Tellikoz		
 Terke		
 Tokatlı		
 Toygaören		
 Tuzaklı		
 Üçpınar		
 Uğruköy		
 Ulucak		
 Yenice		
 Yeşilova		
 Yukarıçobanözü		
 Yukarıgüney		
 Yukarıılıpınar		
 Yukarıikizören		
 Yukarıoba		
 Yukarıyazı		
 Yurttepe

References

Districts of Kastamonu Province